= Katamalli =

- Village
- Country: India
- State: Karnataka
- District: Belgaum

Languages
  - Official: Kannada
- Time zone: UTC+5:30 (IST)

Katamalli is a village in Belgaum district in Karnataka, India.

== Population ==
Katamalli is a medium size village located in Parasgad Taluka of Belgaum district, Karnataka with total 99 families residing. The Katamalli village has population of 531 of which 262 are males while 269 are females as per Population Census 2011. In Katamalli village population of children with age 0-6 is 85 which makes up 16.01 % of total population of village. Average Sex Ratio of Katamalli village is 1027 which is higher than Karnataka state average of 973. Child Sex Ratio for the Katamalli as per census is 977, higher than Karnataka average of 948.

Katamalli village has lower literacy rate compared to Karnataka. In 2011, literacy rate of Katamalli village was 67.94 % compared to 75.36 % of Karnataka. In Katamalli Male literacy stands at 79.91 % while female literacy rate was 56.39 %.

As per constitution of India and Panchyati Raaj Act, Katamalli village is administrated by Sarpanch (Head of Village) who is elected representative of village.
